Charles Spencer Denman, 5th Baron Denman,  (7 July 1916 – 21 November 2012), was a British businessman. His interest in the Middle East, formed during the Second World War, was the focus for most of his business endeavours.

Early life
Denman was born on 7 July 1916 in Penrith, Cumberland. He was the eldest son of Sir Richard Douglas Denman, 1st Baronet, who sat as Liberal Member of Parliament for Carlisle and then as Labour MP for Leeds. He was educated at Shrewsbury School. He left school at 16 with no qualifications.

Following school, he began working as a gardener in Luton Hoo and then in St Mawes, Cornwall. He then set up a market garden at Mylor, Cornwall.

Military service
Shortly before the outbreak of the Second World War in 1939, Denman joined a territorial unit of the Duke of Cornwall's Light Infantry (DCLI). In 1941 he was posted with 1st Battalion DCLI to India, then to Iraq, then to North Africa. On 5 June 1942, during the Battle of Gazala, a hand grenade hurled from a German armoured troop carrier wounded both Denman and a private soldier named Kent in their slit trench, Kent seriously. Denman responded by climbing on top of the armoured vehicle and shooting its commander and two of its crew. He then gathered the remainder of his company, waited until dark, and led them, carrying the mortally injured Kent, twelve miles across the desert by starlight until they found a British unit. Denman was awarded the Military Cross. Later in the war he was involved in preparations for the invasion of Greece.

Later life
Denman died in Highden, West Sussex, aged 96 on 21 November 2012.

Honours and decorations
Denman succeeded to the baronetcy in 1957 on the death of his father and to the barony on the death of a cousin in 1971.

He was awarded the Military Cross (MC) on 13 August 1942 'in recognition of gallant and distinguished service in the Middle East'.

He was appointed Commander of the Order of the British Empire (CBE) in the New Year Honours of 1976. He was appointed Knight Commander of the Royal Order of Francis I in 2004.

References

External links
Obituary - The Times
Obituary - The Telegraph
Obituary - The Independent
DENMAN, 5th Baron, (Charles Spencer Denman), Who's Who 2013, A & C Black, 2013; online edn, Oxford University Press, December 2012.

1916 births
2012 deaths
British businesspeople
Barons in the Peerage of the United Kingdom
People from Penrith, Cumbria
Recipients of the Military Cross
People educated at Shrewsbury School
Commanders of the Order of the British Empire
Duke of Cornwall's Light Infantry officers
British Army personnel of World War II
Charles
20th-century British businesspeople
Denman